Johann Jacob Löwe (1628–1703) was a German Baroque composer and organist at Eisenach.

He was educated in Vienna and recommended by Heinrich Schütz for the position of Hofkapellmeister.

Works
Operas
Löwe composed ten Singspiels and operas, among them Andromeda, to librettos by Anton Ulrich von Braunschweig.

Songs
With his friend Julius Johannes Weiland he published Zweyer gleichgesinnten Freunde Tugend- und Schertz Lieder (1657).

Instrumental
Albert Rodemann: Two Suites (Rodemann); By Loewe Von Eisenach, Johann Jacob (1628–1703).

References

1628 births
1703 deaths
German Baroque composers
German classical composers
German male classical composers
Pupils of Heinrich Schütz